The Climbers is a 1927 silent film produced and distributed by Warner Bros. and presumed lost. The film stars Irene Rich and was directed by Paul Stein. It was based on a 1901 Clyde Fitch play of the same name, but bore scant resemblance to it.

Previous versions of Fitch's play had been made, under the same name, in 1915 with Gladys Hanson and also in 1919 with Corinne Griffith.

Plot
The action takes place in Spain and Puerto Rico during the early 19th-century reign of Ferdinand VII. The Duchess of Arrogan (Irene Rich) is the victim of the machinations of court "climber" Countess Veya (Myrna Loy).  The Countess arranges to hide the king's enemy, Duke Cordova (Forrest Stanley) in the Duchess's room where he is discovered resulting in the banishment of both to the colony of Puerto Rico, and the Duchess's estrangement from her powerful husband. In exile the Duchess successfully but cruelly manages her extensive land holdings, nursing bitterness against all men, while Cordova becomes the bandit El Blanco. The two are thrown together and begin an affair. The Duchess's daughter Laska (Florence Fair) arrives, fleeing an unwelcome marriage to which the death of her father has left her vulnerable. Laska is kidnapped and rescued. The Duchess has a happy resolution, reunited with her daughter and Cordova.

Cast

Irene Rich as Duchess of Arrogan
Clyde Cook as Pancho Mendoza
Forrest Stanley as Duke Cordova
Florence Fair as Sasha 
Myrna Loy as Countess Veya
Anders Randolf as Martinez
Dot Farley as Juana

Rosemary Cooper as Queenalso
Nigel Barrie as Duke of Arrogan
Joseph Striker as Ensign Carlos
Hector Sarno as Miguel
Max Barwyn as King Ferdinand VII
Martha Franklin as Clotilda

See also
List of early Warner Bros. sound and talking features

References

External links

1927 films
American silent feature films
Lost American films
Lost romantic drama films
American films based on plays
Films directed by Paul L. Stein
1927 lost films
1927 romantic drama films
American romantic drama films
American black-and-white films
Films with screenplays by Tom Gibson
1920s American films
Silent romantic drama films
Silent American drama films
Warner Bros. films